The Major Division of Pares is the metropolitan area of the city of Pares, Antigua and Barbuda.
The Major Division consists of Pares, Vernons, Diamonds, and, portions of Parham.

The Major Division has a living condition index of 14.36.

Geography 
The major division has a total land area of 31.08 square kilometers and takes up 96% of Saint Peter's land area, while only making up about 34% of the parishes population

Demographics 
The Major Division of Pares has six enumeration districts.

 51001 Parham-School_1
 51002 Parham-School_2
 51100 Pares-East
 51200 Pares-West 
 51300 Vernons 
 51400 Diamonds

References 

Saint Peter Parish, Antigua and Barbuda
Major Divisions of Antigua and Barbuda